Mangalore–Chennai Mail is a Superfast Mail daily train operated by the Indian Railways (Southern Railway) between the cities of Chennai (Madras) and Mangalore via Salem, Podanur, Palakkad, Shoranur, Tirur, Parapanangadi, Kozhikode, Kannur and Kasaragod. It is one of the oldest train still being operated by Indian Railways. Earlier it ran from Madras Royapuram to Kozhikode (Calicut). When the line extended up to Mangalore, it ran up to Mangalore Central from Royapuram Chennai. When Madras Central came into existence its terminal was changed to Madras Central Chennai Central from Royapuram and it ran as Madras Central Chennai Central - Mangalore Central Malabar Express. Till 1987 it ran as Malabar Express, after that its name was changed to Chennai/Mangalore Mail. It was one of the prestigious train in Indian Railways. It runs always full by having more number of stoppages in northern Kerala beginning from Palakkad Junction to Kasaragod. It also has nine stoppages at Tamilnadu and it doesn't have any other stoppages in Karnataka except Mangalore Central

History                                                                                                                                                                           
There was one single Composite Train called as 01UP/02DOWN Mail from Madras to Old Coimbatore (Now Podanur) to Chaliyam (Old Beypore Calicut) (Nameless with just Number till 1867) Which was bifurcated into 1864CE #BlueMountain (#Neelagiri Express) & 1867MalabarMail. Which was further extended to Kumbla bordering to Mangalore further Extended on 03.07.1907 BG section from Kumbla to Mangalore opened. Later Train was renamed as #MangaloreMail from #MalabarMail.
This train was introduced in the year 1867 and was a replacement of Malabar Express which was diverted to connect Trivandrum to Mangalore . It was introduced as Mangalore - Madras Malabar Express on  July 1, 1867, which had train number 1/2  and as Mangalore/Chennai Mail from 1887. At present it runs with train numbers 12601/12602 Chennai- Mangalore Mail.
It was the first-ever train to enter Kerala with electric locomotive.

Rake sharing 
The train shares its rake with the West Coast Express, Maveli Express and Malabar Express.

 Chennai Central - Mangaluru Central Mail 
 Mangaluru Central - Thiruvananthapuram Central Malabar Express (Via, Kannur, Kottayam) 
 Mangaluru Central - Thiruvananthapuram Central Maveli Express (Via, Kannur, Alappuzha)

Locomotive link
As the route is fully electrified now it is hauled by a WAP-7 locomotive from Royapuram.

References

Named passenger trains of India
Rail transport in Karnataka
Rail transport in Tamil Nadu
Mail trains in India